Fred Flintstone and Friends is an American animated anthology wheel series and a spin-off of The Flintstones produced by Hanna-Barbera and Columbia Pictures Television that aired in daily first-run syndication from September 12, 1977 to September 1, 1978. The series was packaged by Columbia Pictures Television during the 1977–78 television season and was available for barter syndication through Claster Television through the mid-1980s.

Henry Corden made his official debut as Fred Flintstone's speaking voice on this series after Alan Reed died in June 1977. Corden had previously appeared as Fred's singing voice in the theatrical film The Man Called Flintstone (1966) and the television specials Alice in Wonderland or What's a Nice Kid like You Doing in a Place like This? (1966) and Energy: A National Issue (1977). He continued providing Fred's voice in future Flintstones spin-off series and specials, as well as Cocoa Pebbles and Fruity Pebbles cereal commercials, until his death in 2005.

Overview
The series is hosted by Fred Flintstone and featured a repackaging of the following six Hanna-Barbera Saturday morning cartoons that were originally broadcast by the various networks:

The Flintstone Comedy Hour (1972–1974) ("Fred and Barney" and "The Bedrock Rockers" segments)
Goober and the Ghost Chasers (1973–1975)
Jeannie (1973–1975)
Partridge Family 2200 A.D. (1974–1975) (re-titled The Partridge Family in Outer Space)
The Pebbles and Bamm-Bamm Show (1971–1972)
Yogi's Gang (1973)

The six series were repackaged from their original half-hour formats into multi-part serialized segments which were introduced by Fred on a daily basis (via voice-overs on brief bumper clips shown in-between segments). The opening title sequence was a composite, using clips from the openings of the various series, along with a new title theme song. Like many animated series created by Hanna-Barbera in the 1970s, the show contained an inferior laugh track created by the studio.

Voice cast
 Henry Corden as Fred Flintstone (Host), Paw Rugg, Dr. Bigot (Yogi's Gang)
 Josh Albee as Freddy, Jimmy (Yogi's Gang)
 Sherry Alberoni as Laurie Partridge (The Partridge Family in Outer Space)
 Julie Bennett as Cindy Bear (Yogi's Gang)
 Joe Besser as Babu (Jeannie)
 Mel Blanc as Barney Rubble, Dino, Zonk, Stub (The Pebbles and Bamm-Bamm Show, The Flintstone Comedy Hour)
 Danny Bonaduce as Danny Partridge (Goober and the Ghost Chasers, The Partridge Family in Outer Space)
 Tom Bosley as Commadore Phineas P. Fibber (Yogi's Gang)
 Daws Butler as Yogi Bear, Huckleberry Hound, Quick Draw McGraw, Snagglepuss, Wally Gator, Peter Potamus, Augie Doggie, Hokey Wolf, Lippy the Lion, Baba Looey (Yogi's Gang)
 Tommy Cook as S. Melvin Farthinghill (Jeannie)
 Suzanne Crough as Tracy Partridge (Goober and the Ghost Chasers, The Partridge Family in Outer Space)
 Jerry Dexter as Ted (Goober and the Ghost Chasers)
 Susan Dey as Laurie Partridge (Goober and the Ghost Chasers)
 Micky Dolenz as Wonderful Wayne, Spotless Sam (The Partridge Family in Outer Space)
 Carl Esser as Fabian (The Pebbles and Bamm-Bamm Show, The Flintstone Comedy Hour)
 Brian Forster as Chris Partridge (Goober and the Ghost Chasers, The Partridge Family in Outer Space)
 Joan Gerber as Shirley Partridge (The Partridge Family in Outer Space)
 Virginia Gregg as Gossipy Witch of the West (Yogi's Gang)
 Mark Hamill as Corey Anders (Jeannie)
 Jo Ann Harris as Tina (Goober and the Ghost Chasers)
 Gay Hartwig as Betty Rubble, Wiggy, Cindy (The Pebbles and Bamm-Bamm Show, The Flintstone Comedy Hour)
 Bob Hastings as Henry Glopp (Jeannie)
 Rose Marie as Lotta Litter (Yogi's Gang)
 Mitzi McCall as Penny (The Pebbles and Bamm-Bamm Show, The Flintstone Comedy Hour)
 Chuck McLenan as Keith Partridge (The Partridge Family in Outer Space)
 Julie McWhirter as Jeannie (Jeannie),  Marion (The Partridge Family in Outer Space)
 Allan Melvin as Magilla Gorilla, Mr. Sloppy, Mr. Neat, Professor Haggling (Yogi's Gang)
 Don Messick as Boo-Boo Bear, Ranger Smith, Touché Turtle, Atom Ant, Squiddly Diddly, Mayor of Smog City (Yogi's Gang), Schleprock (The Pebbles and Bamm-Bamm Show, The Flintstone Comedy Hour)
 Jay North as Bamm-Bamm Rubble (The Pebbles and Bamm-Bamm Show, The Flintstone Comedy Hour)
 Alan Reed as Fred Flintstone (The Pebbles and Bamm-Bamm Show, The Flintstone Comedy Hour)
 Ronnie Schell as Gilly (Goober and the Ghost Chasers)
 Hal Smith as J. Wanton Vandal, Smiley the Hobo (Yogi's Gang)
 John Stephenson as Doggie Daddy, Hardy Har Har, Mr. Cheerful, Greedy Genie, Hilarious P. Prankster, Envy Brother #2, Captain Swashbuckle Swipe, Fumbo Jumbo the Masked Avenger, Mr. Hothead, Professor Bickering (Yogi's Gang), Mr. Slate, Noodles (The Pebbles and Bamm-Bamm Show, The Flintstone Comedy Hour), Haji (Jeannie), Reuben Kincaid (The Partridge Family in Outer Space)
 Mickey Stevens as Pebbles Flintstone (The Flintstone Comedy Hour)
 Sally Struthers as Pebbles Flintstone (The Pebbles and Bamm-Bamm Show)
 Jean Vander Pyl as Wilma Flintstone (The Pebbles and Bamm-Bamm Show, The Flintstone Comedy Hour), Maw Rugg (Yogi's Gang)
 Janet Waldo as Mrs. Anders (Jeannie)
 Lennie Weinrib as Smokestack Smog (Yogi's Gang), Moonrock, Bronto (The Pebbles and Bamm-Bamm Show, The Flintstone Comedy Hour), Jolly Joe (The Partridge Family in Outer Space)
 Frank Welker as Orbit, Veenie (The Partridge Family in Outer Space)
 Jesse White as Peter D. Cheater (Yogi's Gang)
 Paul Winchell as Goober (Goober and the Ghost Chasers), Sheik of Selfishness (Yogi's Gang)

Weekly airing schedule
The following segments were broadcast in odd weeks:

The following segments were broadcast in even weeks:

See also
 Hanna–Barbera's World of Super Adventure, a later rerun anthology series
 USA Cartoon Express, a daily cartoon block that featured some of these series

References

External links
 
 Fred Flintstone and Friends at The Big Cartoon DataBase

1977 American television series debuts
1978 American television series endings
1970s American animated television series
1970s American anthology television series
American children's animated anthology television series
American animated television spin-offs
First-run syndicated television programs in the United States
The Flintstones spin-offs
Yogi Bear television series
The Partridge Family
I Dream of Jeannie
Television series set in prehistory
Television series by Hanna-Barbera
Television series by Sony Pictures Television
Television series by Warner Bros. Television Studios
English-language television shows
Television series by Claster Television